Fernando Vicente Gaibor Orellana (born October 8, 1991) is an Ecuadorian professional footballer who plays as a central midfielder for C.S.D. Independiente del Valle on loan from Independiente in Primera División Argentina.

Club career

Emelec

2010–2012
He came from Emelec's youth system and he is believed to be one of the most promising young players in Ecuador. He has played for Emelec for all of his short career. According to Ecuadorian pundits, he looks like one of the most promising new players of Ecuador. His club debut came on February 28, in a 5–0 away loss to LDU Quito. He scored his first career goals for Emelec on November 27, in a 3–2 away win against Universidad Catolica, scoring 2 goals. He participated in the 2010 Ecuadorian Serie A final matches against LDU Quito, becoming runner-up champions by an aggregate score of 2–1. Gaibor scored 4 goals in the 2011 season. By the end of the 2011 Ecuadorian Serie A, he was given the Best Young Player award for the season. He again participated in the final matches for league champion, losing to Deportivo Quito by an aggregate score of 2–0, once again becoming runners-up. In the 2011 Ecuadorian Serie A season, he scored 6 goals, in 37 league games played. On April 4, in a home 2012 Copa Libertadores match against Brazil giants Flamengo, Gaibor scored the winning penalty after extra-time, winning 3–2.

2013
Gaibor's first game of the season was an emphatic 3–0 home win over Macara. His first league goal of the season was the winning goal in a thrilling 2–1 away win against Ecuadorian giants LDU Quito. His first goal of the 2013 Copa Libertadores was on April 2, scoring the second goal in the 94th minute, winning the home match against Uruguayan team C.A. Peñarol.

International career
Fernando was part of the Ecuadorian Under 20 squad for the U-20 World Cup in Colombia July 19 – August 20.

He was called up for the Friendly matches against Argentina and Honduras on November 15 and 19, 2013. He made his debut as a second-half substitute for Christian Noboa against Argentina.

Career statistics

International goals
Scores and results list Ecuador's goal tally first.

Honours

Clubs
Emelec
Serie A Runner-up (4): 2010, 2011, 2012, 2016
Serie A (3) : 2013, 2014, 2015

Individual
Emelec
Serie A: Best Young Player Award 2011

References

External links
https://web.archive.org/web/20070627004757/http://www.ecuafutbol.org/Servicios/FichaJugadores.aspx?valor1=1205890658

1991 births
Living people
People from Montalvo Canton
Association football midfielders
Ecuadorian footballers
Ecuadorian expatriate footballers
Ecuador international footballers
Ecuadorian Serie A players
UAE Pro League players
C.S. Emelec footballers
Club Atlético Independiente footballers
Al-Wasl F.C. players
C.S.D. Independiente del Valle footballers
Argentine Primera División players
Expatriate footballers in Argentina
Expatriate footballers in the United Arab Emirates
Copa América Centenario players